CTPI could refer to:

 Centre for Theology and Public Issues, a research centre at the University of Edinburgh
 Consorzio Trasporti Pubblici Insubria, a transport company in Italy